Sphaerodes may refer to:
 Sphaerodes (beetle), a ground beetle genus in the tribe Oodini
 Sphaerodes (fungus), a fungus genus in the family Ceratostomataceae